Adam Fisher Homestead, also known as Artuso Farm, is a historic home and farm located in Mount Pleasant Township, Westmoreland County, Pennsylvania.  The house was built about 1837, and is a two-story, five bay brick dwelling with a cut sandstone foundation in a vernacular Federal style. The farmstead includes the following contributing outbuildings: combination Smoke house / bake oven / coalhouse, combination summer kitchen / wash house, and cooper's shed.

It was added to the National Register of Historic Places in 1991.

References

Farms on the National Register of Historic Places in Pennsylvania
Federal architecture in Pennsylvania
Houses completed in 1837
Houses in Westmoreland County, Pennsylvania
National Register of Historic Places in Westmoreland County, Pennsylvania